In the third season of Idol stjörnuleit, Snorri Snorrason won over Ína Valgerður Pétursdóttir.

Finals

Finalists
(ages stated at time of contest)

Live show details

Heat 1 (18 November 2005)

Heat 2 (25 November 2005)

Heat 3 (2 December 2005)

Heat 4 (9 December 2005)

Heat 5 (16 December 2005)

Live Show 1 (27 January 2006)
Theme: My Idol

Live Show 2 (3 February 2006)
Theme: Songs by Hippies

Live Show 3 (10 February 2006)
Theme: My Birth Year

Live Show 4 (17 February 2006)
Theme: Disco

Live Show 5 (24 February 2006)
Theme: Icelandic Songs

Live Show 6 (3 March 2006)
Theme: British Songs

Live Show 7 (10 March 2006)
Theme: Big Band

Live Show 8 (17 March 2006)
Theme: Icelandic Pop Songs

Live Show 9 (24 March 2006)
Theme: American Songs

Live Show 10: Semi-final (31 March 2006)
Theme: Hits of 2005

Live final (7 April 2006)

External links
Official Website via Web Archive

References

Idol stjörnuleit
2005 Icelandic television seasons
2006 Icelandic television seasons